The Best of Connie Smith is a compilation album by American country singer Connie Smith. It was released in September 1967 via RCA Victor and featured 12 tracks. The disc was Smith's first compilation project released in her career and featured her most popular singles made commercially successful between 1964 and 1967. It also featured one new recording titled "I'll Come Runnin'". Penned by Smith herself and released as a single, the song became a top ten hit on the American country songs chart in 1967.

Background and content
Three years prior to the compilation's release, Connie Smith had reached the peak of her commercial success with 1964's "Once a Day". The song spent eight weeks at the number one spot on the country songs chart and brought a series of follow-up singles into the top ten. RCA Victor had previously issued seven studio albums of her material between 1965 and 1967, sometimes releasing three studio albums per year. The Best of Connie Smith would be her first compilation with the label. It consisted of 12 tracks, all recorded between 1964 and 1966. Nine of these tracks were previously released as singles and reached the top ten of the country chart: "Once a Day" (which topped the chart), "Then and Only Then", "I Can't Remember", "If I Talk to Him", "Nobody But a Fool (Would Love You)", "Ain't Had No Lovin'", "The Hurtin's All Over", "I'll Come Runnin'" and "Cincinnati, Ohio".

The track, "I Saw a Man", was included on Smith's 1966 gospel album called Connie Smith Sings Great Sacred Songs. However, it was not originally released as a single. Another track titled "Darling, Are You Ever Coming Home" first appeared on Smith's eponymous debut studio album but was also not issued as a single. "I'll Come Runnin'" was a new track, penned by Smith. She had attempted to record the track twice with string instrumentation. On a third session done in a traditional country style (and with steel guitarist Weldon Myrick), the song was put on the compilation.

Release and reception

The Best of Connie Smith was released in September 1967 and would mark Smith's first compilation album in her career. It was originally released as a vinyl LP, with six songs on each side of the record. In 1969, RCA Victor issued the album on cassette. The compilation spent 16 weeks on the American Billboard Top Country Albums chart, peaking at number 22 by December 1967. It was Smith's first LP to chart outside the top 20. The album received mixed reception from reviewers. "Dealers shouldn't have any fears about stocking this one," wrote Billboard magazine in October 1967. "The Best of Connie Smith is a much-too-brief sampling of Connie Smith's biggest hits," wrote Thom Owens of AllMusic. He only gave the album two out of five stars. The only new single included was "I'll Come Runnin'", originally issued by RCA Victor in February 1967. Spending 15 weeks on the Billboard Hot Country Songs chart, it peaked at number ten in May 1967.

Track listings

Vinyl version

Cassette version

Chart performance

Release history

References

Footnotes

Books

 

1967 greatest hits albums
Albums produced by Bob Ferguson (music)
Connie Smith compilation albums
RCA Victor compilation albums